Eden Township is one of twenty townships in Fayette County, Iowa. As of the 2010 census, its population was 623.

Geography
According to the United States Census Bureau, Eden Township covers an area of 36.44 square miles (94.37 square kilometers).

Cities, towns, villages
 Waucoma

Unincorporated towns
 Alpha at 
(This list is based on USGS data and may include former settlements.)

Adjacent townships
 Jackson Township, Winneshiek County (north)
 Washington Township, Winneshiek County (northeast)
 Auburn Township (east)
 Windsor Township (southeast)
 Bethel Township (south)
 Stapleton Township, Chickasaw County (west)
 Utica Township, Chickasaw County (northwest)

Cemeteries
The township contains these five cemeteries: Alpha, Oak Lawn, Saint Marys, Saint Rose and Waucoma.

Major highways
  Iowa Highway 193

School districts
 North Fayette Valley Community School District
 Turkey Valley Community School District

Political districts
 Iowa's 1st congressional district
 State House District 18
 State Senate District 9

References
 United States Census Bureau 2008 TIGER/Line Shapefiles
 United States Board on Geographic Names (GNIS)
 United States National Atlas

External links
 US-Counties.com
 City-Data.com

Townships in Fayette County, Iowa
Townships in Iowa